Anthony [Antony] Holborne [Holburne] (c. 1545 – 29 November 1602) was a composer of music for lute, cittern, and instrumental consort during the reign of Queen Elizabeth I.

Life
An "Anthony Holburne" entered Pembroke College, Cambridge in 1562, and it is possible that this person is the same as the composer. A Londoner of the same name was admitted to the Inner Temple Court in 1565, and again this may have been the same person. It is certain, however, that the composer was the brother of William Holborne, and that he married Elisabeth Marten on 14 June 1584. On the title page of both his books he claims to be in the service of Queen Elizabeth. He died of a "cold" in November 1602.

He was held in the highest regard as a composer by contemporaries. John Dowland dedicated the first song I saw my lady weepe in his Second Booke to Holborne. His patron was the Countess of Pembroke, Mary Sidney.  In the 1590s he entered the service of Sir Robert Cecil, the 1st Earl of Salisbury.

His brother was William Holborne. Six of William's madrigals were included in the Cittarn Schoole.

Music
His first known book was the Cittarn Schoole of 1597, consisting of compositions for the cittern. The preface indicates the pieces were composed over a number of years. He writes that the musical compositions are "untimely fruits of my youth, begotten in the cradle and infancy of my slender skill."

The Pavans, Galliards, Almains and other short Aeirs, both grave and light, in five parts, for Viols, Violins, or other Musicall Winde Instruments was published in 1599 and consisted of 65 of his own compositions. It is the largest surviving collection of its kind. Most are of the pavan-galliard combination. Other pieces are of the allemande style. The rest are unclassified.

The Early Music Consort of London's 1976 recording of "The Fairie Round" from this collection was included on the Voyager Golden Record, copies of which were sent into space aboard the Voyager 1 and Voyager 2 space probes in 1977, as a representation of human culture and achievement to any who might find it.

References

Further reading
 Boyd, Morrison Comegys. 1962. Elizabethan Music and Musical Criticism, second edition, revised. Philadelphia: University of Pennsylvania Press. Second printing, with corrections, 1967. Pennsylvania Paperback reprint edition, 1974. .
 Jeffery, Brian. 1966. "Instrumentation in the Work of Antony Holborne". Galpin Society Journal 19:20–26.
 Jeffery, Brian. 1966–67. "The Lute Music of Antony Holborne". Proceedings of the Royal Musical Association 93:25–31.
 Jeffery, Brian. 1968. "Antony Holborne". Musica Disciplina 22: 129–205.
 Kanazawa, Masakata. 1984. "A Comparative Study of Versions for Lute, Cittern, Bandora and Instrumental Ensemble of Compositions by Anthony Holborne". In Le luth et sa musique: Tours, Centre d'études supérieures de la Renaissance, 15–18 septembre 1980: II, edited by John Vaccaro, 123–38. Paris: Editions du Centre national de la recherche scientifique. .
 Ward, John M. 1977. "Anthony Holborne's Letter to an Unnamed Patron". Journal of the Lute Society of America 10:117–18.
 Wentzel, Wayne Clifford. 1976. "The Lute Pavans and Galliards of John Johnson, Anthony Holborne, Francis Cutting, John Dowland, and Daniel Bacheler: A Stylistic Comparison". PhD diss. Pittsburgh: University of Pittsburgh.

External links

Biography at hoasm.org
Anthony Holborne, "The Fruit of Love" – L'Achéron / François Joubert-Caillet – Ricercar RIC339
Anthony Holborne / Elizabethan Consort Music, vol. II  – Jordi Savall et al. – Alia Vox 9813
Edwards, Warwick. "Holborne, Antony [Anthony]". Grove Music Online. Oxford Music Online. Oxford University Press, accessed 7 November 2012 (subscription access).
Music Collection in Cambridge Digital Library which contains early copies/examples of Holborne's compositions

1540s births
1602 deaths
Alumni of Pembroke College, Cambridge
16th-century English composers
17th-century English composers
English classical composers
Renaissance composers
English male classical composers
Composers for lute
17th-century male musicians